Bushfire Moon is a 1987 Australian drama film about a young boy, Ned, who thinks a swagman is Santa Claus.
It was released in the United States as “The Christmas Visitor” on the Disney Channel and as “Miracle Down Under” on VHS.

Cast
 Dee Wallace ... Elizabeth O'Day
 John Waters ... Patrick O'Day
 Charles Tingwell ... Max Bell
 Bill Kerr ... Trevor Watson
 Grant Piro ... Angus Watson
 Nadine Garner ... Sarah O’Day
 Andrew Ferguson ... Ned O'Day

See also
 List of Christmas films

References

External links
Bushfire Moon at IMDb
Bushfire Moon at Oz Movies

Films directed by George T. Miller
Christmas adventure films
Australian Christmas films
1990s Christmas films
1990s English-language films
1980s English-language films
1980s Australian films